Killing, Killings, or The Killing may refer to:

Arts, entertainment, and media

Films
 Killing (film), a 2018 Japanese film
 The Killing (film), a 1956 film noir directed by Stanley Kubrick

Television
 The Killing (Danish TV series), a police procedural drama first broadcast in 2007
 The Killing (U.S. TV series), a crime drama based on the Danish television series, first broadcast in 2011

Literature

 Killing (comics), Italian photo comic series about a vicious vigilante-criminal
 Killing, a series of historical nonfiction books by Bill O'Reilly and Martin Dugard
 "Killings" (short story), a short story by Andre Dubus
 The Killing (Muchamore novel), a CHERUB series installment by Robert Muchamore
 The Killing, a 2012 novelization of the Danish TV series by David Hewson

Music
 "Killing", a song on the album Echoes by The Rapture
 "Killing", a song from an untitled Korn album released in 2007
 The Killing (EP), by Hatesphere

Mathematics
 Several concepts named after Wilhelm Killing:
 Killing tensor, a generalization of a Killing vector field
 Killing vector field or Killing field, a vector field on a Riemannian manifold
 The Killing form, a symmetric bilinear form on a finite-dimensional Lie algebra

People with the name
 Killing (surname)
 Killings (surname)
 Claus Killing-Günkel (born 1963), German interlinguist

See also
 
 
 Kill (disambiguation)
 Killed in action
 Nonkilling